The Han-Bulog Formation is a geologic formation in Albania. It contains fossils dated to the Olenekian to Anisian of the Triassic period.

See also 
 List of fossiliferous stratigraphic units in Albania
 Kalur Chert
 Vigla Formation

References 

Geologic formations of Albania
Triassic System of Europe
Anisian Stage
Olenekian Stage
Paleontology in Albania